A list of windmills in Nord, France.

External links

French windmills website

Windmills in France
Nord
Buildings and structures in Nord (French department)